The Lada Granta is a subcompact car developed by Russian automaker AvtoVAZ in collaboration with Renault, based on the Lada Kalina platform. Mass sales started in Russia on 1 December 2011.

Additional production at the Izhevsk plant began in September 2012, after the old VAZ-2107 was removed from production. A five-door hatchback variant, aimed at replacing the discontinued Lada Samara 2 series in the line-up, debuted in 2014.

The Lada Granta was the best-selling car model in Russia from 2013 to 2015.

Overview
The Lada Granta is considered to be a step away from the classic A-, B-, and C-segment class cars and towards the needs of young Russians and small Russian families wanting supermini sedans designs that are somewhat more popular in Russia after 2010. Moreover, the Granta will likely compete with the foreign market in Russia, since most European superminis exported there are hatchbacks, thus are smaller yet more expensive.

Production halt
Renault ended its collaboration on the Lada Granta when Russia invaded Ukraine in early 2022. When production restarted in June 2022, the Russian-made vehicle did not include airbags, anti-lock brakes, or pollution controls.

From August 23, overcoming some of the consequences of western sanctions, Lada managed to resume Lada Granta production with driver's side airbag for all versions, and passenger's airbag in some models.

In September 2022, company President Maxim Sokolov stated that Lada intends to launch a brand new generation of Lada Granta based on Renault's platform in two or three years' time, including a new crossover. Lada is seeking new suppliers for spare parts and components produced in "friendly" countries.

Specifications

Safety

The Granta was tested by ARCAP in 2012, earning two stars out of four. The test vehicle had a Takata airbag for the driver, but none for the passenger. The head injury criterion was 522 for the driver and 880 for the passenger.

The Granta Lux earned three stars out of four and 10.5 points out of 16 in a crash test conducted in 2015 by ARCAP. The HIC was 590 for the driver and 428 for the passenger, whereas the compression of the thoracic cavity was measured as 28 mm and 25 mm, respectively. The car was tested with two airbags and seat belt pretensioners.

Trim levels

The car is equipped in three different trim levels: Standard, Norm, and Luxe. 

The Norm level includes power steering, front power windows, power door locks, and trip computer, while the Luxe adds passenger airbag, side airbags, antilock braking system, electronic stability control, rear power windows, air conditioning, heated mirrors, heated front seats, and multimedia system with a 7-inch touchscreen display. The Lada Granta is marketed in Russia, Belarus, Ukraine, Armenia, Azerbaijan, and Egypt. Within the European Union, it has been available in the Czech Republic, Slovakia, Austria, Hungary, France, and Germany. Exports to the European Union came to a halt in early 2022 as sanctions were applied to Russia following their invasion of Ukraine. The Lada Granta got a facelift in 2018, which revised the front headlights, grille, and trunk, which now shares its design characteristics with the Lada Vesta and Lada Xray.

In September 2022, Lada offered five versions of the Granta: Sedan, Cross, Liftback, Drive Activ, and Station Wagon. The Station Wagon is also available in two special versions, Club and Cross Quest, with the latter featuring painted roof and rails in black, alloy wheels in black and silver, special interior upholstery, cargo net, heated windscreen, two airbags, multimedia capabilities, rear view camera, parking sensors, and air conditioning.

Motorsport

The Lada Granta WTCC competed in the World Touring Car Championship for the 2012 (part-season), 2013 and 2014 seasons. The main driver of the team was James Thompson, while a second car was driven by Aleksey Dudukalo and Mikhail Kozlovskiy. In the 2014 season, Robert Huff, the champion of the 2012 season, also joined the team in a third car. For the 2015 season, the Granta was replaced by the LADA Vesta.

Recall
In May 2013, AvtoVAZ recalled about 30,000 of sold Lada Grantas and Kalinas because of problems detected in the braking system.

References

External links

Cars of Russia
Granta
Subcompact cars
Sedans
Station wagons
Hatchbacks
Cars introduced in 2011
2020s cars
Touring cars
ARCAP superminis